Rajbala v. State of Haryana (2016) 1 SCC 463 is a judgment of the Supreme Court of India

The Supreme Court of India upheld educational qualifications for contesting panchayat elections in the state of Haryana.

References

External links
Elitist "Judgment of Supreme Court in Rajbala v State of Haryana Damage to Democracy" at Economic & Political Weekly
 https://caravanmagazine.in/vantage/the-supreme-courts-judgement-on-the-haryana-panchayati-raj-act-privileges-the-privileged

Supreme Court of India cases